Leigang station  is a metro station on the Guangfo Line and the northern terminus of Nanhai Tram Line 1.

The platform of the Guangfo Line  opened on 3November 2010, and the platform of Nanhai Tram Line 1 opened on 18 August 2021.

Location
It is located under the junction of Guilan Road and Xiaping West Road, near Leigang Park, in Guicheng Subdistrict in the Nanhai District of Foshan.

Station layout

Exits

Notes

References

Foshan Metro stations
Nanhai District
Railway stations in China opened in 2010
Guangzhou Metro stations